Dmitri Nikolayevich Gadalov (born 28 February 1973) is a former Russian football player.

References

1973 births
Living people
Soviet footballers
Russian footballers
FC Lokomotiv Nizhny Novgorod players
Russian Premier League players
Place of birth missing (living people)
Association football defenders